Brian Musonda (born 25 June 1982) is a retired Zambian football defender.

References

1982 births
Living people
Zambian footballers
Zambia international footballers
Nkwazi F.C. players
Green Buffaloes F.C. players
Association football defenders